Serpent was a steel roller coaster at Six Flags AstroWorld. It was built by Arrow Dynamics in 1969, which made it the park's first roller coaster and the last junior mine train made by Arrow Dynamics. After AstroWorld closed at the end of the 2005 operating season on October 30, 2005, the ride was demolished.

Cory Garcia of the Houston Press described the coaster as "chill" and "so laid-back, even those of us most afraid of rides could probably handle it with grace, or at least only a few screams".

See also
 List of Arrow Dynamics rides

References

Former roller coasters in Texas
Roller coasters operated by Six Flags
Six Flags AstroWorld